Yoda is a fictional character in the Star Wars universe, first appearing in the 1980 film The Empire Strikes Back. He is a small, green humanoid alien who is powerful with the Force and is a leading member of the Jedi Order until its near annihilation. In The Empire Strikes Back, Yoda was voiced and puppeteered by Frank Oz, who reprised the role in Return of the Jedi, the prequel trilogy, and the sequel trilogy. Outside of the films, the character was mainly voiced by Tom Kane, starting with the 2003 Clone Wars animated television series until his retirement from voice acting in 2021. Yoda is an iconic figure in popular culture due to his distinct pattern of speech and role as a wise mentor.

In his first appearance in the original trilogy, Yoda is described as the mentor of Obi-Wan Kenobi, and lives in exile on the swamp planet of Dagobah. He trains Luke Skywalker in the ways of the Force until his death at the age of 900 in Return of the Jedi, though he later returns as a Force spirit. In the prequel trilogy, Yoda leads the Jedi High Council and trains the young generations of Jedi until they are assigned to a master. When the Clone Wars break out, he becomes a general in the Galactic Republic army and leads several legions of clone troopers. Yoda is one of the few Jedi to survive the events of Order 66 at the end of the war, when he battles Emperor Palpatine and is forced to go into hiding. Yoda's spirit appears again in the sequel trilogy, advising an older Luke on his training of Rey.

Concept and creation
Franchise creator George Lucas has stated that he originally had Obi-Wan Kenobi training Luke Skywalker, but decided that it would not make sense to have him standing around watching Luke do all the fighting in the films and not help him, so he killed him off in the first film. He then created a new character, Yoda, to have someone train Luke. Lucas approached Jim Henson to perform the character; Henson, being busy with other projects, instead recommended Frank Oz for the part.
According to the make-up artist Stuart Freeborn, Yoda's face is based on his own and Albert Einstein's (particularly the eye wrinkles of the latter). In early concepts of Yoda, as well as the novelization of The Empire Strikes Back, he had a blue-skinned face instead of a green one.  For The Phantom Menace, he was redesigned to look younger. He was created using computer-generated imagery (CGI) for two distant shots in the 1999 release but remained mostly a puppet, with Stuart Freeborn's original design reinterpreted by Nick Dudman.

Frank Oz provided Yoda's voice in each film and performed as lead puppeteer in Star Wars: Episode V – The Empire Strikes Back (1980), Episode VI – Return of the Jedi (1983), Episode I – The Phantom Menace (1999) and Episode VIII – The Last Jedi (2017). He also performed a vocal cameo as Yoda in Episode IX – The Rise of Skywalker (2019). For some walking scenes in The Empire Strikes Back and The Phantom Menace, dwarf actors Deep Roy and Warwick Davis appeared in costume as Yoda (though neither was credited). While Oz served as the primary performer, over the years he had been assisted by a multitude of other puppeteers, including: Kathryn Mullen (Ep. V), Wendy Froud (Ep. V), David Barclay (Ep. V–VI), Mike Quinn (Ep. VI), David Greenaway (Ep. I & VI), Don Austen (Ep. I), Kathy Smee (Ep. I), Dave Chapman (Ep. VIII), Damian Farrell (Ep. VIII), and Colin Purves (Ep. VIII). For the radio dramatizations of The Empire Strikes Back and Return of the Jedi, Yoda was voiced by John Lithgow while Tom Kane voiced him in the Clone Wars animated series and several video games.

Rendered with computer animation in Episode II – Attack of the Clones and Episode III – Revenge of the Sith, Yoda appeared in ways not previously possible, including his participation in elaborate fight scenes. In Revenge of the Sith, his face appears in several big close-ups, demanding highly detailed CGI work. His digital incarnation, overseen by Rob Coleman, was deliberately designed to be consistent with the limitations of the puppet version, including the occasional ear-jiggling.

Yoda was recreated in CGI for the 2011 Blu-ray release of The Phantom Menace. A clip of the new CG Yoda from The Phantom Menace was first seen in the featurette The Chosen One, included in the 2005 DVD release of Revenge of the Sith. The 2012 theatrical 3D release of The Phantom Menace matches the 2011 cut featuring the CG version of Yoda.

Performance
To perform Yoda in The Empire Strikes Back, Frank Oz inserted his right hand into the puppet's head, using said hand to control Yoda's mouth, while his left hand controlled Yoda's left hand. A second puppeteer, Kathryn Mullen, assisted Oz on the Dagobah set, operating Yoda's right hand. Wendy Midener, a puppet builder who had worked with Oz and Mullen on The Muppet Show, and later The Dark Crystal and Labyrinth, was originally supposed to control Yoda's eyes, but when something on the set caused an allergic reaction for Midener, she was demoted to controlling Yoda's ears, with then-newcomer David Barclay operating the eyes instead (Barclay also substituted for Oz as lead Yoda puppeteer for production shoots when Oz was unavailable). For wide shots of Yoda moving around, actor and stunt performer Deep Roy wore a life-sized Yoda costume.

Character overview
Grand Master Yoda is among the oldest, most stoic, and most powerful Jedi Masters in the Star Wars universe. George Lucas opted to have many details of the character's life history remain unknown. Yoda's race and home world have not been named in any official media, canonical or otherwise, and he is merely said to be of a "species unknown" by the Star Wars Databank. Yoda's characteristic speech patterns were conceived by Lucas and Lawrence Kasdan, and developed by Oz. Academic syntacticians have found them somewhat inconsistent, but have extrapolated that they possess object–subject–verb (OSV) word order, making them anastrophic.

The films and Expanded Universe reveal that Yoda had a hand in training almost every Jedi Master in the galaxy. In the Star Wars prequel films, he instructs several younglings in the Jedi Temple before they are assigned to a master. In The Empire Strikes Back he mentions that he had been training Jedi "for 800 years", which means he must have been a Master Jedi for quite some time before that.

Appearances

Original trilogy

The Empire Strikes Back (1980)
Yoda makes his first film appearance in The Empire Strikes Back. Luke Skywalker (Mark Hamill) arrives on Dagobah to seek his guidance, having been instructed to do so by the Force ghost of Obi-Wan Kenobi (Alec Guinness), who describes him as "the Jedi Master who instructed me."

Yoda does not initially identify himself to Luke and instead tests his patience by presenting himself as a comical backwater individual, deliberately provoking both Luke and R2-D2. Luke is shocked when he finally discovers that this small, eccentric creature is the powerful Jedi Master he was seeking. Finding that Luke has the same anger and recklessness which caused his father's downfall, Yoda is reluctant to teach him the ways of the Force and agrees only at Obi-Wan's behest. Before finishing his training, Luke chooses to leave Dagobah in order to confront Darth Vader and save his friends on Bespin. Yoda and Obi-Wan warn him that he is not ready to face Vader and is being lured into a trap but Luke leaves anyway. When Obi-Wan laments that Luke is their "last hope," Yoda reminds him that "there is another."

Return of the Jedi (1983)
Yoda makes a brief appearance in Return of the Jedi, set a year after The Empire Strikes Back. Now sick and frail, Yoda informs Luke that he has completed his training but will not be a Jedi until he confronts Darth Vader; he also confirms that Vader is Luke's father, something Vader had told Luke in the previous film. Yoda then peacefully dies at the age of 900, his body disappearing as he becomes "one with the Force". He leaves Luke with the knowledge that "there is another Skywalker." Moments later, Obi-Wan's ghost helps Luke come to the realization that the "other" of whom Yoda spoke is his twin sister, Princess Leia.

In the film's final scene, after the Empire has been defeated, Luke sees Yoda's spirit looking upon him with pride alongside Obi-Wan and the redeemed Anakin Skywalker, Vader's former Jedi self.

Prequel trilogy

Episode I: The Phantom Menace (1999)
Yoda returns as a younger version of himself in the prequel trilogy beginning with The Phantom Menace. The film marked the final time Oz would portray the character as a puppet until the release of The Last Jedi (2017). However, in the 2011 Blu-ray release of The Phantom Menace, the Yoda puppet was replaced by a CGI character to match the later depiction of the character. In the film, which is set 35 years before The Empire Strikes Back, Jedi Master Qui-Gon Jinn brings the young Anakin Skywalker to the Jedi Council. Qui-Gon is convinced that Anakin is the "Chosen One" of Jedi prophecy who will bring balance to the Force and requests the boy be trained as a Jedi. Yoda senses great fear in Anakin, especially in regards to his attachment to his mother Shmi, and foresees "grave danger" in his training. The council, led at the time by Yoda's former padawan Mace Windu, rejects Qui-Gon's request.

When Qui-Gon is mortally wounded in a duel with Sith Lord Darth Maul, his dying request to his Padawan Obi-Wan Kenobi (Ewan McGregor) is that Anakin be trained as a Jedi. Obi-Wan, determined to fulfill his promise to his master, tells Yoda that he will train the boy, even without the council's approval. Yoda makes Obi-Wan a Jedi knight and reluctantly gives his blessing to Anakin's training.

Episode II: Attack of the Clones (2002)

Yoda makes his first CGI appearance in Attack of the Clones, set a decade after The Phantom Menace. Yoda, now in direct control of the Order's policy as Master of the High Council in addition to his traditional position as Grandmaster, is one of the many Jedi who are concerned about the emergence of the Confederacy of Independent Systems, a secessionist movement wanting independence from the Galactic Republic. After the first attempted assassination of Senator Padmé Amidala, Chancellor Palpatine suggests that she be put under the protection of Obi-Wan, who is training Anakin. In a deleted scene, a meditating Yoda senses Anakin slaughtering the Tusken Raiders who murdered his mother.

At the climax of the film, Yoda arrives in time to save Obi-Wan and Anakin from the Separatists and defeats his former apprentice, Count Dooku, the Separatists’ leader and a Sith lord, in a lightsaber duel.

Episode III: Revenge of the Sith (2005)
In Revenge of the Sith, Yoda leads the Jedi Council in pursuing the mysterious Sith Lord Darth Sidious. Palpatine has by then amassed near-dictatorial emergency powers and begins interfering in Jedi affairs by appointing Anakin as his personal representative on the council. The Council grants Anakin a Council seat but denies him the rank of Master, feeling that doing so would amount to giving Palpatine a vote in the council. Additionally they order him to spy on Palpatine, whom Anakin considers a friend and mentor.

Anakin seeks Yoda's counsel about his prophetic visions that someone close to him will die. Yoda, unaware that the person of whom Anakin speaks is Padmé, or that she is Anakin's wife and pregnant with his child, tells him to "train yourself to let go of everything that you fear to lose." Unsatisfied, Anakin turns to Palpatine, who then reveals himself as Darth Sidious. Sidious manipulates the young Jedi into becoming his Sith apprentice, Darth Vader, with the promise that the dark side of the Force holds the power to save Padmé from dying in childbirth.

Sidious later transforms the Republic into the tyrannical Galactic Empire, proclaiming himself emperor for life and ordering the clone troopers to kill their Jedi generals. Yoda is on Kashyyyk, overseeing the battle between the Separatist forces and a combined command of clone troopers and Wookiees. Through the Force, Yoda feels the deaths of each of the Jedi as they are assassinated by their own troops. After swiftly killing the clone troopers instructed to kill him, he escapes with Wookiee leaders Tarfful and Chewbacca to Coruscant, where he and Obi-Wan fight their way into the Jedi Temple to stop a trap for all surviving Jedi. Inside, they discover that all the Jedi inside, younglings included, have been slaughtered. They then discover a holographic recording revealing Vader as the assassin. Yoda decides to face Sidious, sending Obi-Wan to kill Vader. When Obi-Wan protests, Yoda tells him that the Anakin he knew no longer exists, having been "consumed by Darth Vader."

Subsequently, Yoda battles Sidious in a lightsaber duel that damages the Senate Rotunda. In the end, neither is able to overcome the other and Yoda is forced to retreat. He goes into exile on Dagobah so that he may hide from the Empire and wait for another opportunity to destroy the Sith. At the end of the film, it is revealed that Yoda has been in contact with Qui-Gon's spirit, learning the secret of immortality from him and passing it on to Obi-Wan.

Yoda is also instrumental in deciding the fate of the Skywalker children after Padmé dies in childbirth, recommending that Luke and Leia be hidden from Vader and Sidious; he sends Leia to be adopted by Senator Bail Organa of Alderaan, and Luke to Vader's stepfamily Owen and Beru Lars on Tatooine. Other than the ancient Jedi Master, only the Organas, the Lars family, R2-D2 and Obi-Wan know of their true identities.

Sequel trilogy

The Force Awakens (2015)
In The Force Awakens, set 30 years after Yoda's death in Return of the Jedi, Yoda's voice is heard by the young scavenger Rey in a Force vision after she discovers Luke Skywalker's lightsaber under a castle owned by Maz Kanata.

The Last Jedi (2017)
In The Last Jedi, Yoda appears to Luke as a Force spirit as he debates whether to burn down the tree storing the Sacred Texts of the Jedi. As Luke makes his way to the tree, Yoda appears behind him and reminds him that a Jedi must always be sure of his path. When Luke decides to burn down the tree, Yoda summons a lightning bolt and sets it ablaze. When confronting Yoda as to why he did it, Yoda assures Luke that the books contained no knowledge that Rey didn't already possess. He stressed that true Jedi knowledge was not found in books but within Jedi themselves—and it is their responsibility to pass that knowledge on, reminding him, "The greatest teacher, failure is." As Luke takes in the message, he shares a quiet moment with his former master, who informs him that the burden of all masters is being surpassed by their students.

Unlike in the prequels, where fight scenes necessitated the character be rendered in with computer-generated imagery, Yoda is once more portrayed using puppetry, with Frank Oz once again both puppeteering (with three assistants) and voicing the character.

Star Wars: The Rise of Skywalker  (2019)
Yoda is heard in Star Wars: The Rise of Skywalker as one of the voices of Jedi past who speak to Rey during her battle against the reborn Darth Sidious.

Animated series

Clone Wars (2003)
Yoda appears in the 2003 Cartoon Network 2D-animated television series Star Wars: Clone Wars, voiced by Tom Kane. In the show, Yoda is made a general, like many of the Jedi Knights and Masters. Yoda escorts Padmé on their journey to an unspecified planet, but Yoda senses several Jedi in distress on Ilum. Using the Jedi mind trick to convince Captain Typho to take them to Ilum, Yoda saves two Jedi Knights and finds a message from Count Dooku giving orders to destroy the Jedi Temple on Ilum. In the animated series' final episode, Yoda fights side by side with Mace Windu to defend Coruscant, which is under attack from the Separatists. The two Jedi Masters realize too late that the battle is a distraction; Separatist leader General Grievous truly intends to kidnap Palpatine. The Jedi Master's effort to stop Grievous fails, and Palpatine is taken hostage, thus setting the stage for Revenge of the Sith.

In 2014, the series was deprecated from the Disney canon, in favor of the 3D CGI series Star Wars: The Clone Wars.

Star Wars: The Clone Wars (2008)
Yoda appears in The Clone Wars, again voiced by Tom Kane. In the pilot film, Yoda assigns Anakin Skywalker his own padawan, Ahsoka Tano as he believes that she will help Anakin grow as a Jedi and as a person. Throughout most of the series, Yoda spends his time on Coruscant with the Jedi Council but he occasionally leaves for certain tasks, such as negotiations with King Katuunko on Rugosa and a confrontation with Asajj Ventress's droid army. Yoda also watches over Anakin and Ahsoka throughout the series, pleased that they are both maturing with each other's influence. However, in the final arc of season five, Ahsoka is framed for a crime she didn't commit and Yoda and the Jedi Council turn her over to the Republic military. Along with other members of the council, Yoda observes Ahsoka's trial but Anakin bursts in with the true culprit, fallen Jedi Barriss Offee, before the verdict can be read. Afterwards Yoda, Anakin, and the Council personally invite Ahsoka to rejoin the Order but she refuses and leaves. According to show runner Dave Filoni, Yoda blames himself for Ahsoka's departure as he had made her Anakin's padawan in the first place.

In the final arc of the sixth season, Yoda hears Qui-Gon Jinn speaking to him from beyond the grave. Yoda flees the Jedi Temple with R2-D2 to travel to Dagobah, his future home, to find answers. Shown cryptic visions of the fall of the Jedi, Yoda learns he has been chosen to manifest his consciousness after death as a Force ghost. Yoda is tested by a group of spirit priestesses in order to overcome trials and temptations on his pilgrimage; one of these tests is to face an illusion of ancient Sith lord Darth Bane. Yoda's final test is to resist an attempt by Darth Sidious and Dooku to lure him to the dark side with a false vision of deceased Jedi Master Sifo Dyas. Yoda engages in a metaphysical battle with Sidious and appears to sacrifice his life in order to save Anakin's–only to awaken and discover that the battle was merely a vision and that he has passed the test. The priestesses inform Yoda that his training will resume in time.

Star Wars Rebels (2014)
Yoda was heard in the Star Wars Rebels episode "Path of the Jedi" with Frank Oz reprising the role for the first time since Revenge of the Sith. He communicates with padawan Ezra Bridger and his master Kanan Jarrus during their experience in an ancient temple on Lothal, helping the pair do some soul-searching to analyze their true motivations. He appears physically for the first time in the season two episode "Shroud of Darkness", in which he appears in a vision of Ezra's and reunites with Ahsoka. His appearance in the series differs from his usual countenance as an homage to an early Ralph McQuarrie design for the character as well as a classic Kenner action figure. This was justified by premise that Ezra is viewing the character through his own imagination, but the decision was confusing to many viewers.

Star Wars: Tales of the Jedi (2022) 
Yoda is seen in two of the six episodes of Tales of the Jedi, in a non-speaking role. His first appearance can be found in the third episode of the anthology miniseries, titled "Choices", in which he attends the funeral of Jedi Master Katri. The Jedi Grand Master's second appearance in the series can be found within its fifth episode, "Practice Makes Perfect". In this, Yoda is present alongside other Jedi Masters, including Mace Windu, watching Padawan Ahsoka Tano being tested against training remotes designed to simulate battle droids. In his final appearance in the series (within the same episode), Yoda, alongside Obi-Wan Kenobi, lays witness to a conversation between Anakin Skywalker and Ahsoka Tano, in which Skywalker informs Tano that he will formulate a test more challenging than the one she just partook in.

Literature
Yoda appears extensively in the Star Wars Expanded Universe, mostly in works set during or before the prequel trilogy, including Sean Stewart's 2004 novel Yoda: Dark Rendezvous, in which he sends an impersonator of himself to negotiate a potential treaty with Dooku, suspected his offer to be a feint. He also appears as a supporting character in Dark Horse Comics' Republic, and various other Clone Wars-related titles. In April 2014, following The Walt Disney Company's acquisition of Lucasfilm, all of these works were rebranded as Star Wars Legends and declared non-canon to the rest of the franchise.

Since 2014, Yoda has also been featured in a number of canon books and other works, including Dooku: Jedi Lost and Master & Apprentice, which take place before The Phantom Menace. He is set to appear in the upcoming The High Republic Adventures, set 200 years before the prequel trilogy.

In popular culture
In 1980, American musician and parody artist "Weird Al" Yankovic wrote and recorded a parody of the Kinks' "Lola", called "Yoda". It was later rerecorded for his 1985 album Dare to Be Stupid, after Yankovic was able to obtain permission from both George Lucas and the Kinks.

In 2007, Yoda was selected by Empire magazine as the "25th greatest movie character of all time." On their list of the 100 Greatest Fictional Characters, Fandomania.com ranked Yoda at number 60.

Yoda also appears in Disney's Star Tours: The Adventures Continue attraction with his original voice actor, Frank Oz.

Linguistics professor David Ager from Queen Mary University of London says Yoda's language most closely resembles the Hawaiian language.

In 2017, a photoshopped image of Yoda seated next to King Faisal at the signing of the Charter of the United Nations in San Francisco in 1945 was inadvertently printed in a social studies textbook. The textbook was withdrawn once the error was discovered.

In 2019, discount store Poundland used the voice of Yoda at its self-service checkouts in stores across the United Kingdom.

Merchandising

TomTom has included a "Yoda" voice as one of the Celebrity GPS voicings in their "Star Wars" voice series.

Lego
Lego's Yoda minifigure was the first of their figures to be shorter than the other toys in the Lego Star Wars line; it has shorter legs than the other action figures. Yoda appears in a television series based on the Lego Star Wars toys, including Lego Star Wars: The Yoda Chronicles and The New Yoda Chronicles, of which he is the focus, as well as The Padawan Menace and Droid Tales.

Themes
Quotes from Yoda that seem to echo Gnostic ideas in The Empire Strikes Back:
"Luminous beings are we, not this crude matter"
"A Jedi uses the Force for knowledge and defense, never for attack."

Relationships

Mentorship tree

See also
 Yoda conditions – a style of writing conditionals in computer programming languages

References

Works cited

The Jedi Apprentice series by Dave Wolverton and Jude Watson
Episode I: The Phantom Menace, 1st edition paperback, 1999. Terry Brooks, George Lucas, 
Episode III: Revenge of the Sith – Novelization, 1st edition hardcover, 2005. Matthew Woodring Stover, George Lucas, 
The Annotated Screenplays, softcover, 1997. George Lucas, Leigh Brackett, Lawrence Kasdan, Laurent Bouzereau, 
The Courtship of Princess Leia, 1995. Dave Wolverton, 
Mission from Mount Yoda, 1993. Paul Davids, Hollace Davids, 
A Guide to the Star Wars Universe, 2nd edition, 1994. Bill Slavicsek, 
The Essential guide to Characters (Star Wars), 1st edition, 1995. Andy Mangels, 
The New Essential Guide to Characters, 1st edition, 2002. Daniel Wallace, Michael Sutfin, 
Star Wars: The Visual Dictionary, hardcover, 1998. David West Reynolds, 
Star Wars: Revenge of the Sith: The Visual Dictionary, hardcover, 2005. James Luceno, 
Star Wars Roleplaying Game: Revised Core Rulebook, hardcover, 2002. Bill Slavicsek, Andy Collins, J.D. Wiker, 
Star Wars Roleplaying Game: Power of the Jedi Sourcebook, hardcover, 2002. Michael Mikaelian, Jeff Grubb, Owen K.C. Stephens, James Maliszewski,

External links

 Yoda on IMDb

Characters created by George Lucas
Fantasy television characters
Film characters introduced in 1980

Extraterrestrial superheroes
Fictional diplomats
Fictional empaths
Fictional exiles
Fictional generals
Fictional genocide survivors
Fictional ghosts
Fictional hermits
Fictional humanoids
Fictional martial arts trainers
Fictional sole survivors
Fictional spiritual mediums
Fictional war veterans
Fictional wizards
Male characters in film
Male characters in television
Fictional characters with precognition
Star Wars animated characters
Star Wars Jedi characters
Star Wars puppets
Star Wars Skywalker Saga characters
Star Wars: The Clone Wars characters
Star Wars Rebels characters
Tales of the Jedi (TV series) characters
Star Wars video game characters